Stephen Kevin Bannon (born November 27, 1953) is an American media executive, political strategist, and former investment banker. He served as the White House's chief strategist in the administration of U.S. president Donald Trump during the first seven months of Trump's term. He is a former executive chairman of Breitbart News and previously served on the board of the now-defunct data-analytics firm Cambridge Analytica.

Bannon was an officer in the United States Navy for seven years in the late 1970s and early 1980s. After his military service, he worked for two years at Goldman Sachs as an investment banker. In 1993, he became acting director of the research project Biosphere 2. He became an executive producer in Hollywood, producing 18 films between 1991 and 2016. In 2007, he co-founded Breitbart News, a far-right website which he described in 2016 as "the platform for the alt-right".

In 2016, Bannon became the chief executive officer of Trump's 2016 presidential campaign and was appointed chief strategist and senior counselor to the president following Trump's election. He left the position eight months later and rejoined Breitbart. In January 2018, Bannon was disavowed by Trump for critical comments reported in the book Fire and Fury, and left Breitbart.

After leaving the White House, Bannon opposed the Republican Party establishment and supported insurgent candidates in Republican primary elections. Bannon's reputation as a political strategist was questioned when former Alabama Supreme Court chief justice Roy Moore, despite Bannon's support, lost the 2017 United States Senate election in Alabama to Democrat Doug Jones. Bannon had declared his intention to become "the infrastructure, globally, for the global populist movement". Accordingly, he has supported many national populist conservative political movements around the world, including creating a network of far-right groups in Europe.

In August 2020, Bannon and three others were arrested on federal charges of conspiracy to commit mail fraud and money laundering in connection with the We Build the Wall fundraising campaign. According to the grand jury indictment, Bannon and the defendants promised that all contributions would go to building a U.S.–Mexico border wall, but instead enriched themselves. Bannon pleaded not guilty. On January 20, 2021, on his last day in office, Trump pardoned Bannon, sparing him from a federal trial. Federal pardons do not cover state offenses, and in September 2022, Bannon was charged in New York state court on counts of fraud, money laundering, and conspiracy in connection to the "We Build The Wall" campaign.

In November 2020, Bannon's Twitter account was permanently suspended after he suggested that the federal government's infectious disease expert Anthony Fauci and FBI director Christopher Wray should be executed.

Bannon was held in contempt of Congress in October 2021 after he refused to comply with a subpoena issued by the Select Committee on the January 6 Attack, the U.S. House of Representatives committee investigating the 2021 United States Capitol attack. He was indicted by a federal grand jury on two criminal charges of contempt of Congress. In July 2022, he was convicted on both counts in a jury trial. He was sentenced on October 21, 2022, to four months in prison and a $6,500 fine. He is appealing his conviction and sentence, and his sentence was put on hold pending the appeal.

Early life 
Stephen Kevin Bannon was born November 27, 1953, in Norfolk, Virginia, to Doris (née Herr), a homemaker, and Martin J. Bannon Jr., who worked as an AT&T telephone lineman and as a middle manager. He grew up in a working-class family that was pro-Kennedy and pro-union Democrat. He is of Irish and German descent. Much of his mother's side of the family settled in the Baltimore area. Bannon graduated from Benedictine College Preparatory, a private, Catholic, military high school in Richmond, Virginia, in 1971, and then attended Virginia Tech, where he served as the president of the student government association. During the summers he worked at a local junkyard.

In 1976 he graduated from Virginia Tech College of Architecture and Urban Studies with a bachelor's degree in urban planning. While serving in the navy, he earned a master's degree in national security studies in 1983 from Georgetown University School of Foreign Service. In 1985, Bannon earned a Master of Business Administration degree with honors from Harvard Business School.

Service as naval officer 
Bannon was an officer in the United States Navy for seven years in the late 1970s and early 1980s; he served on the destroyer  as a surface warfare officer in the Pacific Fleet, and afterwards as a special assistant to the chief of naval operations at the Pentagon. Bannon's job at the Pentagon was, among other things, handling messages between senior officers and writing reports about the state of the Navy fleet worldwide. While at the Pentagon, Bannon attended Georgetown University at night and obtained his master's degree in national security studies.

In 1980, Bannon was deployed to the Persian Gulf to assist with Operation Eagle Claw during the Iran hostage crisis. In a 2015 interview, Bannon said that the mission's failure marked a turning point in his political world-view from largely apolitical to strongly Reaganite, which was further reinforced by the September 11 attacks. He recounted, "I wasn't political until I got into the service and saw how badly Jimmy Carter fucked things up. I became a huge Reagan admirer. Still am. But what turned me against the whole establishment was coming back from running companies in Asia in 2008 and seeing that [George W.] Bush had fucked up as badly as Carter. The whole country was a disaster."

Business career

Investment banking 
After his military service, Bannon worked at Goldman Sachs as an investment banker in the Mergers and Acquisitions Department. In 1987, he relocated from New York to Los Angeles, to assist Goldman in expanding their presence in the entertainment industry. He stayed at this position with Goldman in Los Angeles for two years, and left with the title of vice president.

Pivot in career into media and investing 
In 1990, Bannon and several colleagues from Goldman Sachs launched their own company Bannon & Co., a boutique investment bank specializing in media. In one of Bannon & Co.'s transactions, the firm represented Westinghouse Electric which wanted to sell Castle Rock Entertainment. Bannon negotiated a sale of Castle Rock to Turner Broadcasting System, which was owned by Ted Turner at the time. Instead of a full adviser's fee, Bannon & Co. accepted a financial stake in five television shows, including Seinfeld, which was in its third season. Bannon still receives cash residuals each time Seinfeld is aired.

Société Générale purchased Bannon & Co. in 1998.

Earth science 
In 1993, while still managing Bannon & Co., Bannon became acting director of the earth science research project Biosphere 2 in Oracle, Arizona. Under Bannon, the closed-system experiment project shifted emphasis from researching human space exploration and colonization toward the scientific study of earth's environment, pollution, and climate change. He left the project in 1995.

Entertainment and media 

In the 1990s, Bannon ventured into entertainment and media, and became an executive producer in the Hollywood film and media industry. Bannon produced 18 films, from Sean Penn's drama The Indian Runner (1991) to Julie Taymor's film Titus (1999). Bannon became a partner with entertainment industry executive Jeff Kwatinetz at film and television management company The Firm, Inc., 2002–2003.

In 2004, Bannon made a documentary about Ronald Reagan titled In the Face of Evil. Through the making and screening of this film, Bannon was introduced to Reagan's War author Peter Schweizer and publisher Andrew Breitbart, who would later describe him as the Leni Riefenstahl of the Tea Party movement. Bannon was involved in the financing and production of a number of films, including Fire from the Heartland: The Awakening of the Conservative Woman (2010), The Undefeated (2011), and Occupy Unmasked (2012).

Bannon persuaded Goldman Sachs to invest, in 2006, in a company known as Internet Gaming Entertainment. Following a lawsuit, the company rebranded as Affinity Media, and Bannon took over as CEO. From 2007 through 2011, Bannon was the chair and CEO of Affinity Media.

In 2007, Bannon wrote an eight-page treatment for a new documentary called Destroying the Great Satan: The Rise of Islamic Facism (sic) in America. The outline states that "although driven by the 'best intentions,' institutions such as the media, the Jewish community and government agencies were appeasing jihadists aiming to create an Islamic republic." In 2011, Bannon spoke at the Liberty Restoration Foundation in Orlando, Florida, about the Economic Crisis of 2008, the Troubled Assets Relief Program, and their impact in the origins of the Tea Party movement, while also discussing his films Generation Zero (2010) and The Undefeated.

Breitbart News 
Bannon was a founding member of the board of Breitbart News, a far-right news, opinion and commentary website. Philip Elliott and Zeke J. Miller of Time have said that the site has "pushed racist, sexist, xenophobic and antisemitic material into the vein of the alternative right". Bannon said that Breitbart's ideological mix included libertarians, Zionists, the conservative gay community, same-sex marriage opponents, economic nationalists, populists, as well as the alt-right, with the alt-right comprising a very small proportion overall. Conceding the alt-right holds views with "racial and anti-Semitic overtones," Bannon said he has zero tolerance for such views.

In March 2012, after founder Andrew Breitbart's death, Bannon became executive chairman of Breitbart News LLC, the parent company of Breitbart News. Under his leadership, Breitbarts editorial tone became more nationalistic, and also became increasingly friendly to the alt-right. In 2016, Bannon declared the website "the platform for the alt-right". Speaking about his role at Breitbart, Bannon said, "We think of ourselves as virulently anti-establishment, particularly 'anti-' the permanent political class." Ben Shapiro, a former Breitbart editor and colleague of Bannon, called Bannon a "'bully' who 'sold out [Breitbart founder] Andrew's mission in order to back another bully, Donald Trump.'"

On August 18, 2017, Breitbart announced that Bannon would return as executive chairman following his period of employment at the White House. Because of the break with Trump, Bannon's position as head of Breitbart News was called into question by Breitbart's owners, and on January 9, 2018, he stepped down as executive chairman. The billionaire funders of Breitbart, Robert and Rebekah Mercer, reportedly decided to push out Bannon from Breitbart in part because of his break with Trump, and in part because they had become weary of Bannon's "impulsive and attention-seeking antics" and Bannon's expenditures on "travel and private security."

Bannon hosted a radio show (Breitbart News Daily) on the SiriusXM Patriot satellite radio channel.

Other media activities 
In 2005, Bannon secured $60 million in funding from Goldman Sachs and other investors for IGE (Internet Gaming Entertainment), a company based in Hong Kong that employed "low-wage Chinese workers" to play World of Warcraft, a massively multiplayer online role-playing game, in order to earn gold in-game that could be traded for virtual items, which could then be sold to players of the video game for real-world money.

While some gamers liked IGE's offers of World of Warcraft money that would normally take hours to farm, other gamers called it cheating. Many gamers responded by posting anti-Chinese vitriol. Blizzard Entertainment, the owners of the video game, eventually shut down accounts used by "gold farmers". IGE was also the target of a class action lawsuit by a player who said that IGE's practices were "substantially impairing" people's enjoyment of the game.

While this business model by IGE failed in the end, Bannon became interested in the game's online community, describing its members as "rootless white males, [who] had monster power." Through Breitbart News editor Milo Yiannopoulos, whom Bannon recruited, Bannon realized that he could "activate that army." of gamers and Internet trolls, adding that "They c[a]me in through Gamergate or whatever and then get turned onto politics and Trump."

Since 2019, Bannon has hosted Bannon's War Room on Robert J. Sigg's Real America's Voice television network, podcast platforms, and on the radio.

Government Accountability Institute 
Bannon was executive chair and co-founder of the Government Accountability Institute, a tax-exempt 501(c)(3) organization where he helped orchestrate the publication of Breitbart News senior Editor-at-large Peter Schweizer's book Clinton Cash, from its founding in 2012 until his departure in August 2016. The organization creates fact-based indictments against politicians using the deep web, tax filings, flight logs, and foreign government documents and then forwards their findings to the media. The organization is registered as nonpartisan but it mainly investigates alleged corruption, crony capitalism, and misuse of taxpayer money within the Democratic Party. The group has spread conspiracy theories about Hillary Clinton and Joe Biden. For the years 2012 through 2015, he received between $81,000 and $100,000 each year; the organization reported that he worked an average of 30 hours per week for the organization.

Cambridge Analytica 
Bannon served as vice president of the board of Cambridge Analytica, a data-analytics firm owned largely by the Mercer family, who also co-owns Breitbart News; the firm allegedly used illegal tactics to target American voters in the 2016 election. According to former Analytica employee Christopher Wylie, Bannon oversaw the collection of Facebook data which was used to target American voters. Wylie who helped with creation of the company referred to the company as a "psychological warfare tool". Bannon was paid more than $125,000 for his work at Cambride Analytica. Bannon's stake in Cambridge Analytica was estimated at between 1 and 5 million dollars, but he sold his stake in the company once he joined the Trump administration in April 2017.

The Movement 
In 2017, Bannon founded the Movement, a populist organization which frequently promotes right wing populist groups in Europe which are against the EU government and political system in Europe. The group is also known for its opposition to George Soros's Open Society Foundations, Bannon has referred to Soros as "evil but brilliant". The organization employees 10 full time staff members. Mischaël Modrikamen, the leader of the Belgian People's Party, serves as executive director. The organization has received praise from figures like Prime Minister Viktor Orbán and Italian Eurosceptic party M5S leader Luigi Di Maio.

Brief political career

Donald Trump 2016 presidential campaign 
On August 17, 2016, with 88 days until the 2016 presidential election, Bannon was appointed chief executive of Donald Trump's presidential campaign. Bannon left Breitbart, as well as the Government Accountability Institute and Cambridge Analytica, to take the job. Shortly after he had assumed the chief executive role, the chairman of the Trump campaign, Paul Manafort, was dismissed.

On November 13, following Donald Trump's election to the presidency, Bannon was appointed chief strategist and senior counselor to the president-elect. His appointment drew opposition from the Anti-Defamation League (ADL), the Council on American–Islamic Relations, the Southern Poverty Law Center, Democratic Senate Minority Leader Harry Reid, and some Republican strategists because of statements in Breitbart News that were alleged to be racist or antisemitic. However, a number of prominent Jews of the (politically) conservative persuasion defended Bannon against the allegations of anti-Semitism, including Ben Shapiro, David Horowitz, Pamela Geller, Bernard Marcus of the Republican Jewish Coalition, Morton Klein, the Zionist Organization of America, and Rabbi Shmuley Boteach.
Alan Dershowitz at first defended Bannon, saying there was no evidence he was antisemitic, but then in a later piece stated that Bannon had made bigoted statements against Muslims, women, and others. The ADL stated "We are not aware of any anti-Semitic statements from Bannon." Bannon had referred to French National Front (now National Rally) politician Marion Maréchal-Le Pen as "the new rising star".

On November 15, 2016, U.S. representative David Cicilline of Rhode Island released a letter to Trump signed by 169 Democratic House representatives urging the president-elect to rescind his appointment of Bannon. The letter stated that appointing Bannon "sends a disturbing message about what kind of president Donald Trump wants to be", because his "ties to the White Nationalist movement have been well documented"; it went on to present several examples of Breitbart Newss alleged xenophobia. Bannon denied being a white nationalist and said, rather, that he was an "economic nationalist."

On November 18, during his first interview not conducted by Breitbart Media since the 2016 presidential election, Bannon remarked on some criticisms made about him, saying, "Darkness is good: Dick Cheney. Darth Vader. Satan. That's power. It only helps us when they get it wrong. When they're blind to who we are and what we're doing." The quote was published widely in the media.

In an interview with The New York Times in late November, Trump responded to the controversy over Bannon's appointment, saying, "I've known Steve Bannon a long time. If I thought he was a racist, or alt-right, or any of the things that we can, you know, the terms we can use, I wouldn't even think about hiring him."

In an interview with BBC Newsnight, Bannon said that his role was to "recalibrate" the campaign, which had at that point lost its message. He "stepped in and got the campaign refocused", but he rebuffed the idea that he was the reason Trump won the presidency, saying "Trump is unique in American political history, he's his own closer." Bannon said his role was to make sure that Hillary Clinton was held up as a "guardian of a corrupt and incompetent establishment" and this that was key to winning votes in states that Trump needed to win.

Reuters reported on October 31, 2018, that the Senate Intelligence Committee is conducting a "wide-ranging" investigation of Bannon's activities during the campaign, including knowledge he may have had about any contacts between Russia and two campaign advisors, George Papadopoulos and Carter Page, as well as his role with Cambridge Analytica.

Trump administration

Transition to the presidency
In 2018, Michael Lewis published a quote ascribed to Bannon, made while the transition team for Trump was supposed to be preparing for the next administration, and The Guardian used it twice in the title of an excerpt from the 2018 Lewis book The Fifth Risk. The book examined the difference between the transition preparations provided by the administration that was exiting and what did or did not occur, and it revealed a profound lack of preparedness and concern, as expressed in the quote.

National Security Council 

At the end of January 2017, in a departure from the previous format of the National Security Council (NSC), the holder of Bannon's position, along with that of the chief of staff, were designated by presidential memorandum as regular attendees to the NSC's Principals Committee, a Cabinet-level senior inter-agency forum for considering national security issues. The enacted arrangement was criticized by several members of previous administrations and was called "stone cold crazy" by Susan E. Rice, Barack Obama's last national security adviser. In response, White House press secretary Sean Spicer pointed to Bannon's seven years experience as a Navy officer in justifying his presence on the committee.

Presidency of Donald Trump
Upon his inauguration, Trump appointed Bannon to be his chief strategist, a newly created position. The title made him a counselor to the president, nearly equivalent in authority to the chief of staff. As a staff member in the Executive Office of the President, the position did not require Senate confirmation. Breitbart News editor Julia Hahn followed Bannon to the White House, where she was appointed as Bannon's aide, as well as special assistant to President Trump.

In an interview with The Hollywood Reporter in the aftermath of the 2016 election, Bannon analogized his influence with Trump to that of "Thomas Cromwell in the court of the Tudors".

Several days after Trump's inauguration, Bannon told The New York Times, "The media should be embarrassed and humiliated and keep its mouth shut and just listen for a while. I want you to quote this: the media here is the opposition party. They don't understand this country. They still do not understand why Donald Trump is the president of the United States."

Bannon, along with Stephen Miller, was involved in the creation of Executive Order 13769, which resulted in restricted U.S. travel and immigration by individuals from seven countries, suspension of the United States Refugee Admissions Program (USRAP) for 120 days, and indefinite suspension of the entry of Syrians to the United States. According to The Economist, a British news magazine, Bannon and Miller "see Mr [Vladimir] Putin as a fellow nationalist and crusader against cosmopolitanism."

In February 2017, Bannon appeared on the cover of Time, on which he was labeled "the Great Manipulator". The headline used for the associated article was "Is Steve Bannon the Second Most Powerful Man in the World?", alluding to Bannon's perceived influence in the White House.

In a March 14, 2019 hearing of the House Committee on Oversight and Government Reform, Commerce Department secretary Wilbur Ross was questioned about his conversations regarding the adding of a citizenship question to the 2020 census surveys, which he had with Bannon, who in turn had referred him to immigration hardliners Kris Kobach and Attorney General Jeff Sessions. Missouri Democratic representative Lacy Clay accused Ross of being "complicit" regarding his efforts to weaken minority group voting rights, additionally accusing him of committing perjury with respect to those contacts. Clay called for Ross to tender his resignation, saying, "You lied to Congress. You misled the American people and you are complicit in the Trump administration's intent to suppress the growing political power of the non-white population." Ross said the change was in response to a request by the Justice Department for statistics to protect voting rights. On April 23, 2019, the United States Supreme Court heard arguments regarding appeals of rejections by three circuit courts of the proposed inclusion of the survey question.

It was reported that Bannon intentionally published stories to undermine H. R. McMaster. Bannon allegedly did this by leaking information to the alternative media, including alt-right writer Mike Cernovich. It was also reported that the Trump administration retroactively granted Bannon a blanket exemption from federal ethics rules that allowed him to communicate with editors at Breitbart News, which according to former Breitbart consultant Kurt Bardella would be proof of the administration's intent to allow him to continue being "the de facto editorial director of Breitbart" (italics added). In the final hours of Donald Trump's administration, Steve Bannon was issued a presidential pardon. The accompanying announcement said he was "an important leader in the conservative movement and is known for his political acumen."

Bannon was removed from his NSC role in early April 2017 in a reorganization by U.S. national security advisor H. R. McMaster, whom Bannon had helped select. Some White House officials said Bannon's main purpose in serving on the committee was as a check against former national security advisor Michael T. Flynn, who had resigned in February 2017 for misleading the vice president about a conversation with the Russian ambassador to the United States. Hence, with Flynn gone, Bannon was no longer needed. Bannon reportedly opposed his removal from the council and threatened to quit if President Trump went forward with it, although Republican megadonor Rebekah Mercer urged him to stay. The White House said Bannon had not attempted to leave, and Bannon said any indication that he threatened resignation was "total nonsense". Bannon only attended one NSC meeting.

Russia investigation 
Bannon was interviewed multiple times by Robert Mueller as part of the investigation into Russian interference in the 2016 United States presidential election. Bannon was reportedly interviewed about Roger Stone's contact with Wikileaks. In November 2019, Bannon gave evidence in the federal criminal trial of Roger Stone. Bannon did not voluntarily testify; rather, he was compelled to give evidence under subpoena. Bannon testified that Stone was WikiLeaks' access point for the Trump campaign; the testimony helped establish that Stone lied to Congress. Stone was subsequently convicted on all charges (lying to Congress and witness tampering), but on July 10, 2020, his federal prison sentence was commuted by President Trump. Asked for a comment after Bannon himself was arrested on August 20, 2020, Stone replied, "Karma is a bitch. But I am praying for him."

In August 2020 members of the senate intelligence committee told the DOJ they believed that Bannon, Jared Kushner, and Donald Trump Jr. may have misled them with their testimony about Russia investigation.

Quotes in Michael Wolff books 
In January 2018, upon the publication of Michael Wolff's book Fire and Fury: Inside the Trump White House, which attributed many controversial and inflammatory statements to Bannon, Bannon and Trump became estranged and were widely seen as enemies. The book quoted Bannon as saying that Ivanka Trump was "as dumb as a brick"; that the meeting among Donald Trump Jr., Jared Kushner, Paul Manafort, and agents of Russia was "treasonous"; and that Special Prosecutor Robert Mueller would cause Donald Trump Jr. to "crack like an egg on live television". Bannon also warned that investigators would likely uncover money laundering involving Jared Kushner and his family business loans from Deutsche Bank.

In his 2019 book Siege, Wolff wrote, "Trump was vulnerable because for 40 years he had run what increasingly seemed to resemble a semi-criminal enterprise," then quoted Bannon as saying, "I think we can drop the 'semi' part." Wolff wrote that Bannon predicted investigations into Trump's finances would be his political downfall, quoting Bannon as saying, "This is where it isn't a witch hunt – even for the hard core, this is where he turns into just a crooked business guy, and one worth $50 million instead of $10 billion. Not the billionaire he said he was, just another scumbag."

Relationship with Donald Trump 
In January 2018, after excerpts from Fire and Fury were published, Trump promptly disavowed Bannon, saying that Bannon "lost his mind" when he left the White House, and attacking him in multiple angry statements. Trump asserted in a tweet that Bannon had "cried when he got fired and begged for his job" and publicly referred to Bannon with an unflattering nickname ("Sloppy Steve") in reference to Bannon's disheveled appearance. On January 7, 2018, Bannon expressed regret over his delayed response, declared his "unwavering" support for Trump and his agenda, and praised Donald Trump Jr. Bannon said his remarks about the campaign meeting were aimed at Manafort instead of Trump Jr., a detail which Wolff contested.

Despite Trump's disparagement of him, Bannon retained ties with Trump. In an appearance in August 2019 on CNBC, Bannon praised Trump as a "great leader as president" and "amazing campaigner"; in response, Trump called Bannon "one of my best pupils" and "still a giant Trump fan" and said he "loved working with" Bannon. In 2018, Bannon released a pro-Trump documentary, Trump @War through his production company, Victory Films; the film aimed to galvanize Trump supporters ahead of the 2018 elections in a bid to keep a Republican majority in the House. In October 2019, Bannon began co-hosting War Room: Impeachment, a daily radio show and podcast in which he offered advice to the Trump administration and its allies on how to counter the impeachment inquiry against Donald Trump. In 2020, Bannon began a podcast War Room: Pandemic, broadcast from his Capitol Hill townhouse; Bannon told friends that Trump had "told others that he watches the program and that the president was familiar enough with it to cite specific interviews he had seen when the two men spoke this summer." A February 2023 Brookings Institution study found Bannon's podcast contained the highest proportion of false, misleading and unsubstantiated statements among 36,603 episodes produced by 79 prominent political podcasters.

Departure from the White House 
Bannon's employment in the White House ended on August 18, 2017, less than a week after the Charlottesville Unite the Right rally which degenerated into violence and acrimony. Whereas members of both political parties condemned the hatred and violence of white nationalists, neo-Nazis and alt-right activists, The New York Times noted that Trump "was the only national political figure to spread blame for the 'hatred, bigotry and violence' that resulted in the death of one person to 'many sides'." The decision to blame "many sides" was reported to have come from Bannon. The NAACP released a statement saying that while they "acknowledge and appreciate President Trump's disavowment of the hatred which has resulted in a loss of life today," they called on Trump "to take the tangible step to remove Steve Bannon – a well-known white supremacist leader – from his team of advisers". The statement further described Bannon as a "symbol of white nationalism" who "energized that sentiment" through his current position within the White House.

Some sources stated that White House chief of staff John F. Kelly asked Bannon on August 18, 2017, to submit his immediate resignation in lieu of being fired. Bannon, however, stated he was not fired but rather submitted his two-week resignation notice on August 4, 2017. He reminded The Weekly Standard that he had joined then-presidential candidate Trump's campaign on August 14, 2016, and said he'd "always planned on spending one year," but that he stayed a few more days due to the Unite the Right rally in Charlottesville, Virginia.

In an official statement, White House press secretary Sarah Huckabee Sanders said: "John Kelly and Steve Bannon have mutually agreed today would be Steve's last day. We are grateful for his service and wish him the best."

The same day, Breitbart News announced that Bannon would return to the site as executive chairman. Several weeks after his departure it was reported that Trump still called Bannon using his personal cell phone, and was only calling when chief of staff Kelly was not around. The Washington Post reported in October 2017 that Trump and Bannon remained in regular contact.

Republican Senate primaries 
Bannon has made efforts to unseat incumbent Republican members of Congress he deemed to be insufficiently supportive of Trump's agenda. In October 2017, Bannon said he planned to sponsor primary challenges against six of the seven incumbent Republican senators in the 2018 elections. He said he had two requirements for a candidate to earn his support: they must pledge to vote against Mitch McConnell as Senate majority leader and to end the Senate filibuster. Bannon used his group Citizens of the American Republic to aide him in his efforts to help keep Republican control of the House of Representatives in the 2018 election. The group is a dark money organization; Bannon declined to "describe his donors or how much money the group has raised."

Bannon received credit for helping Roy Moore defeat incumbent senator Luther Strange in the September Republican primary for the 2017 special Alabama Senate election, despite Trump's having endorsed Strange. After nine women alleged sexual misconduct, Bannon doubled down on his support for the candidate, raising doubt about the veracity of the accusations. When Ivanka Trump condemned Moore's campaign in Alabama, saying "there's a special place in hell for people who prey on children", Bannon responded, "What about the allegations about her dad and that 13-year-old?", in reference to a woman who accused Trump and sex offender Jeffrey Epstein of raping her at that age.

In what had been considered a safe Republican seat, Moore lost the election on December 12, 2017. Bannon's reputation as a political strategist was subsequently questioned by Republican commentators.

Post-White House career

Work abroad 
After leaving the White House, Bannon declared his intention to become "the infrastructure, globally, for the global populist movement." He toured Europe to speak at events with various far-right political parties there, in a bid to build a network of right-wing populist-nationalist parties aspiring to government. Bannon visited  the Dutch Party for Freedom, the Freedom Party of Austria, the UK Conservative Party, the Swiss People's Party, the UK Independence Party, the Flemish Vlaams Belang, the Belgian People's Party,Alternative for Germany, France's National Front (now the National Rally), the Italian League, the Brothers of Italy, Hungary's Fidesz, the Sweden Democrats,  the Polish Law and Justice,  Spain's Vox, the Finns Party, the pan-European identitarian movement, Republika Srpska's Alliance of Independent Social Democrats, the Five Star Movement, and the Israeli Likud. Bannon believes that these movements – along with Japan's Shinzo Abe, India's Narendra Modi, Russia's Vladimir Putin, Saudi Arabia's Mohammad bin Salman, China's Xi Jinping, Turkey's Recep Tayyip Erdoğan, and Trump, as well as similar leaders in Egypt, the Philippines, Poland, and South Korea – are part of a global shift towards nationalism. Bannon's attempt to build a network of far-right parties in Europe had only limited success; while he appeared at events with the French National Rally's Marine Le Pen and the Italian League's Matteo Salvini, the Sweden Democrats said that it had "no interest" in Bannon's initiative, the Flemish Vlaams Belang called it "poorly organized," and the Alternative for Germany cited divergent views among the parties. Right-wing populist parties did not achieve a surge in support in the 2019 European Parliament elections. The Atlantic cited a number of factors inhibiting Bannon's project, including differing national and ideological views among the European far right and U.S.-skeptical views held by some parties of the European extreme right.

Bannon supports the Dignitatis Humanae Institute, a right-wing Catholic organization in Italy formerly based in what was previously Trisulti Charterhouse; Bannon drafted a leadership course curriculum for the group to train conservative Catholic political activists. In 2018, Bannon announced that he planned to establish a right-wing academy on the site, with the support of Benjamin Harnwell, a British associate of Bannon's who underwrote the project and aimed to create a "gladiator school for culture warriors." However, in 2019, the group's rights to use the former monastery were revoked by the Italian government because it determined that the lessee Dignitatis Humanae Institute failed to meet several criteria to operate the monastery and failed in its obligation to pay a "concession fee" as well as maintenance and security expenses.

In August 2018, Bannon met with Eduardo Bolsonaro, the son of far-right candidate Jair Bolsonaro, and served as informal advisor to the Bolsonaro campaign in the Brazilian presidential elections that year. In February 2019, the younger Bolsonaro joined Bannon's organization the Movement as its representative in South America. In March 2019, Bannon met with both Bolsonaros in Washington, D.C.

In October 2017, after leaving the White House, Bannon met exiled Chinese billionaire businessman Guo Wengui (also known as Miles Kwok), and the pair cultivated a friendship, frequently meeting in Dallas, at Guo's apartment at the Sherry-Netherland in New York, and on Guo's yacht. In 2017, Guo reportedly gave a $150,000 loan to Bannon shortly after he left the White House, and a Guo-linked company entered into a $1 million consulting contract with Bannon, beginning in August 2018. In early 2020, Bannon and Guo raised hundreds of millions of dollars in a private offering for a company called GTV Media Group. In August 2020, the Wall Street Journal reported that the fundraising for the company was under investigation of federal and state authorities.

Guo has allowed Bannon to use one of his two private jets, and during the 2018 election campaign, Bannon flew on Guo's Bombardier Global Express to events in support of Republican congressional candidates in New Mexico and Arizona. The flights were revealed in February 2020 by ProPublica. Bannon made the flights under the auspices of his dark money group, Citizens of the American Republic. Several campaign finance experts who spoke with ProPublica said the trips could violate federal campaign finance law, which prohibits foreign nationals from making contributions to candidates in U.S. political campaigns (including in-kind contributions such as payment for campaign-related travel). Guo and Bannon denied that the travel was for campaign activity; an attorney for Bannon's group stated that the trips on the private jet were to promote Bannon's film, Trump@War.

On June 3, 2020, Bannon and Guo participated in declaring a "New Federal State of China" (also called "Federal State of New China"). It was said that they would overthrow the Chinese government. In New York City, planes were seen carrying banners which said "Congratulations to Federal State of New China!".

On August 20, 2020, federal prosecutors in New York unsealed criminal charges against Stephen K. Bannon and three other men they alleged defrauded donors to a massive crowdfunding campaign that said it was raising money for construction of a wall along the U.S.-Mexico border. After Bannon's arrest, Guo Wengui hurriedly cut ties with him, stressed that he was not involved in Bannon's affairs outside their shared efforts "fighting for democracy in China", and would no longer allow Bannon to continue to serve as a member of Guo Media's board of directors.

In November 2020, The New York Times reported that Bannon along with Guo Wengui had been promoting Li-Meng Yan's account of COVID-19. The pair had bought Yan a plane ticket to the United States, provided her accommodation, coached her in media appearances and helped secure interviews with conservative television hosts including Tucker Carlson. Yan later said that the COVID-19 virus was artificially made, however her interview was rejected on social media as misinformation and her research rejected by scientists who said it was "based on conjecture" though filled with jargon.

Treatment of colleagues 
In an interview with Frontline, former writer for Breitbart News Ben Shapiro said that he tried to avoid interacting with Bannon due to a fear of being on his bad side. Shapiro also recalled Bannon yelling and cursing at people at Breitbart News. Those who worked with Bannon have described him as “egomaniacal" and “purely Machiavellian”. Other former staffers at Breitbart who spoke to Politico said that Bannon would degrade employees by mocking their intelligence and would imply they were “expendable, low-life creatures”. Several employees who left Breitbart alleged that when they attempted to find employment outside of Breitbart, Bannon attempted to sabotage them. However, other employees praised Bannon's leadership describing him as a generous, loyal, caring, and supportive. Many described Bannon as someone who would pay out of his own pocket for personal expenses.

In his memoir, White House senior adviser Jared Kushner recalled having an abrasive relationship with Bannon and two occasions in which Bannon threatened him, including one in which he threatened to 'break Kushner in half' after he accused Bannon of leaking to the press. Also in his memoir Kushner writes “Bannon single-handedly caused more problems for me than anyone else in my time in Washington. He probably leaked and lied about me more than everyone else combined. He played dirty and dragged me into the mud of the Russia investigation".

Connection to Jeffrey Epstein 
According to Michael Wolff, Bannon was introduced to Epstein in 2017 and Epstein introduced Bannon to some of his friends. In August 2018, the New York Post alleged that Bannon was then trying to restore Epstein's favor for financial gain after Bannon met with Epstein at his mansion in New York. Bannon also worked with Ehud Barak and attorney Reid Weingarten to attempt to reform Epstein's public image. Later reports showed Bannon reportedly prepped Epstein for an interview with 60 minutes that ultimately never occurred. Bannon confirmed that he did tape 15 hours of interviews with Epstein, though denied that he was coaching him for further interviews and that the footage was for an unannounced documentary on Epstein.

Criminal prosecutions

Dismissed 1996 domestic violence charges
Bannon was charged with misdemeanor domestic violence, battery, and dissuading a witness in early January 1996 after his then-wife, Mary Piccard, accused Bannon of domestic abuse. The Santa Monica Police Department crime report states that after Piccard called 911, an officer arrived at their home and observed red marks on Piccard's wrist and neck. The charges were later dropped when Piccard did not appear in court. In her divorce filing, Piccard stated her absence was due to threats made against her by Bannon and his lawyer: Bannon, she said, told her that "if I went to court, he and his attorney would make sure that I would be the one who was guilty." She said that Bannon's lawyer also threatened her," telling her that if Mr. Bannon went to jail, she "would have no money and no way to support the children." Bannon's lawyer denied pressuring Piccard not to testify.

Charges related to "We Build the Wall" campaign

2020 federal fraud and money laundering indictment
On August 20, 2020, a federal grand jury indictment was unsealed against Bannon and three others, charging them with conspiracy to commit wire fraud and money laundering. Each charge has a maximum penalty of 20 years in prison upon conviction. Federal prosecutors of the U.S. Attorney's Office for the Southern District of New York allege that Bannon, United States Air Force veteran Brian Kolfage and the two other defendants used funds received from the We Build the Wall fundraising campaign, marketed to support the building of a border wall between the U.S. and Mexico, in a way which was "inconsistent" with how they were advertised for use to the public. According to the indictment, donations were collected through a GoFundMe campaign that was launched in December 2018. Bannon promoted the project until the day before the indictment, saying "You've been the leader of this, assisting President Trump in building this wall in these tough areas" in his War Room: Pandemic podcast.

Federal prosecutors allege that Bannon and the three other men conspired to use a non-profit group run by Bannon, and a shell company controlled by one of the other defendants, to make payments to themselves, despite promises to donors that their contributions would go to build a wall. Prosecutors also alleged that Bannon received more than $1 million in connection with the plan, some of which was paid to Kolfage in secret and some of which Bannon and two other defendants allegedly used for personal expenses ranging from paying off credit cards to personal travel. Prosecutors stated that they plan to seize the assets of Bannon's non-profit Citizens of the American Republic, as well as other organizations "politically aligned with [Donald] Trump".

Bannon was arrested by U.S. postal inspectors on Long Island Sound, off the coast of Connecticut, on board People's Republic of China expatriate Guo Wengui's luxury yacht. Later that day, Bannon pleaded not guilty to the charges. Bannon was released pending trial on a $5 million bond, of which Bannon was required to put up $1.7 million. He was required to surrender his passport and his domestic travel was restricted. Following the indictment, Donald Trump and his son, Donald Trump Jr. distanced themselves from Bannon. Trump Jr. had originally been supportive of Bannon's fundraising efforts for the Trump wall.

At a preliminary hearing on August 31, U.S. district judge Analisa Torres set a trial date for May 24, 2021. Prosecutors revealed that they had collected a large number of emails found on various devices and online storage accounts after search warrants were executedsome earlier in the year.

Pardon by Trump
On January 20, 2021, Trump pardoned Bannon, part of a spate of pardons Trump issued on his last day in office.

In May 2021, Judge Torres, following the precedent of criminal cases being dismissed following presidential pardons, dismissed the fraud case against Bannon. Torres said that because the pardon was valid, dismissal of the indictment was "the proper course." In her ruling, Torres stated that despite Bannon not pleading guilty, "the issuance of a pardon may carry an imputation of guilt; acceptance a confession of it." She further quoted: "If there be no guilt, there is no ground for forgiveness."

2022 New York state indictment
Federal pardons only cover federal offenses, so Trump's pardon of Bannon did not preclude state charges against him. By February 2021, the Manhattan district attorney had issued subpoenas to Wells Fargo Bank and GoFundMe, which had provided accounts for the venture, signaling that a criminal investigation on state charges was advancing. In August 2022, Bannon was indicted on New York state charges of money laundering, conspiracy and fraud related to the $25 million "We Build The Wall" scheme. Bannon claimed the charges were politically motivated, and—invoking a common right-wing conspiracy theory—somehow linked the charges to financier George Soros. Bannon said that he and Trump would not "stop fighting" and that "they will have to kill me first". He surrendered to authorities on September 8.

2022 Contempt of Congress conviction
On September 23, 2021, the U.S. House Select Committee on the January 6 Attack subpoenaed Bannon, ordering him to appear on October 14. His lawyers gave the committee advance notice that he would not comply. After he did not appear, the House of Representatives voted to hold him in criminal contempt of Congress and to refer him to the Justice Department. This was initiated by the nine-member Committee's unanimous vote on October 19, followed by the full House of Representatives which voted 229–202, with all 220 Democrats and 9 Republicans in favor of the resolution, on October 21. He was indicted by a federal grand jury on November 12, 2021, on two criminal contempt charges: one count of not providing documents, one count of not testifying. Three days later, Bannon surrendered to the FBI. He was represented by criminal defense attorney David Schoen.

Bannon was released pending trial, without bail, but on conditions, including keeping authorities informed of his whereabouts, and not leaving the country. He pleaded not guilty. An appeals court in April 2022 rejected his appeal regarding his failure to testify before the committee.

In the days leading up to his trial, Bannon offered to testify before the January 6 committee after all; U.S. District Judge Carl J. Nichols, a Trump appointee, rejected Bannon's offer as a "last-ditch attempt to avoid accountability." Bannon sought to delay his trial to October, citing negative publicity from the concurrent televised committee hearings; the court denied the motions. Bannon incorrectly asserted Trump had claimed executive privilege over his testimony and documents He said he would call prominent Democrats such as Nancy Pelosi to testify at his trial, asserting on his podcast, "we're going medieval on these people." Nichols denied the defense motions, finding that Bannon was not entitled to raise an "advice of counsel" defense or an executive privilege defense. After the judge's ruling, Bannon's attorney Schoen asked the court, "what's the point of going to trial if there are no defenses?", to which Nichols replied, "agreed," hinting that Bannon should seek a plea deal.

The trial began on July 18, 2022, with the jury being finalized the next day. Bannon declined to call witnesses or testify in his own defense.

On July 22, 2022, the jury found Bannon guilty on both charges. Bennie Thompson and Liz Cheney, the chairman and vice chairman, respectively, of the January 6 Committee, called Bannon's conviction "a victory for the rule of law and an important affirmation of the Select Committee's work." The U.S. Department of Justice prosecutor said that Bannon "chose allegiance to Donald Trump over compliance with the law" and that "No one is above the law"; prosecutors also said that  Bannon had "thumbed his nose" at American democracy and law.

On October 21, 2022, Judge Nichols sentenced Bannon to serve four months in prison and pay a $6,500 fine. Nichol rejected an array of arguments offered by Bannon, including that he was protected by executive privilege from being compelled to testify, and stated in issuing the sentence that "Others must be deterred from committing similar crimes." The U.S. Department of Justice had requested the maximum penalty (six months in jail), plus a $200,000 fine. On November 4, 2022, Bannon appealed his conviction and sentence; he remained free pending appeal, with his sentence being put on hold.

Social media bans 
During the November 5, 2020, edition of his webcast, Bannon called for the beheadings of Anthony Fauci, the government's top infectious diseases expert, and FBI director Christopher Wray. Bannon said that if it were up to him, after beheading Fauci and Wray, "I'd put the heads on pikes" and display them outside the White House "as a warning to bureaucrats" who dared oppose Trump. By the end of the day, Facebook and YouTube had deleted the video from their platforms, and Twitter had permanently banned his account for glorifying violence. Mailchimp also disabled Bannon's email newsletter. The next day, Bannon was dropped by a lawyer who had been defending him against federal charges of fraud.

On January 9, 2021, Rudy Giuliani appeared on War Room, accusing Democrats of stealing the recent presidential election and blaming them for the storming of the Capitol. Hours later, YouTube removed both the podcast channel and another one called "Trump at War – A Film by Stephen K. Bannon", citing a "violation of YouTube's Terms of Service."

Political ideology 
Bannon is a Reaganite and has described himself as a populist.

In an interview, Bannon told journalist Michael Lewis in February 2018, "We got elected on Drain the Swamp, Lock Her Up, Build a Wall. This was pure anger. Anger and fear is what gets people to the polls." He added, "The Democrats don't matter. The real opposition is the media. And the way to deal with them is to flood the zone with shit."

According to The Guardian in January 2018, Bannon's ideology is substantially similar to that of Stephen Miller, Tucker Carlson, Benny Johnson, Raheem Kassam and Matthew Boyle, the latter two having been protégés of Bannon at Breitbart.

Individual issues 
A self-described economic nationalist, Bannon advocates for reductions in immigration and restrictions on free trade with China and Mexico. He has referred to himself as a "proud Christian Zionist" in reference to his support of Israel. He has been described as a white nationalist, but rejects the description. He generally believes in reducing the size of the federal bureaucracy, declaring at the Conservative Political Action Conference he favored the "deconstruction of the administrative state".

Paris climate agreement 
Bannon was a strong opponent of the Paris climate agreement during his time in the Trump administration, he successfully persuaded Donald Trump to withdraw from it.

Immigration 
Bannon favors reducing immigration, both legal and illegal immigration, to the U.S. and asserts that immigration threatens national sovereignty. Bannon has suggested that too many Silicon Valley chief executives are Asian or South Asian, and that this undermines "civic society." In a 2015 radio appearance, Bannon expressed opposition to resettling any refugees of the Syrian Civil War in the U.S. In a 2016 radio appearance, Bannon asserted that illegal immigration was "horrific" but that legal immigration was "the beating heart of this problem"; that levels of legal immigration to the U.S. were "scary"; and that legal immigrants had "kinda overwhelmed the country."

Bannon is the chairman of We Build The Wall, an organization involved in the construction of the proposed expansion of Mexico–United States barrier.

Economics 
Bannon often describes himself as an economic nationalist, criticizing crony capitalism, Austrian economics, and the objectivist capitalism of Ayn Rand. He also generally considers himself a free-market capitalist. Bannon favors raising federal income taxes to 44 percent for those earning incomes over $5 million a year as a way to pay for middle class tax cuts. He also supports significantly increasing spending on infrastructure, describing himself as "the guy pushing a trillion-dollar infrastructure plan".

In 2014, during a conference at the Vatican, Bannon criticized Wall Street for its role in the 2008 financial crisis. He has also criticized bail outs for big banks and is angered by the fact that Wall Street banks have not been held accountable for the financial crisis, which he says fueled populist fury and groups such as the Tea Party.

Foreign policy 
He is generally skeptical of military intervention abroad, opposing proposals for the expansion of U.S. involvement in the War in Afghanistan, the Syrian Civil War, and the crisis in Venezuela.

In Afghanistan, he supported a proposal by Erik Prince for the deployment of private military contractors instead of the U.S. military. He believes "there is no military solution" to the 2017 North Korea crisis.

Bannon has described U.S. allies in Europe, the Persian Gulf, the South China Sea, the Strait of Malacca, as well as South Korea and Japan, as having become "protectorates of the United States" that do not "make an effort to defend [themselves]", and believes NATO members should pay a minimum of 2% of GDP on defense.

Bannon opposes upgrading the U.S. nuclear arsenal. Bannon strongly favors U.S. withdrawal from the Iran nuclear deal, and was supportive of the approach taken by Saudi Crown Prince Mohammed bin Salman during the 2017 Qatar diplomatic crisis.

During his tenure as White House Chief Strategist, Bannon opposed the 2017 Shayrat missile strike, but lost the internal debate on the matter to Kushner. He also expressed skepticism about the 2020 assassination of Qasem Soleimani, questioning whether it was "necessary to kill this guy and to kill him now and to exacerbate the military issues", and warned that an escalation with Iran could undermine Trump's support with "working-class, middle-class people, particularly people whose sons and daughters actually fight in these wars."

He has referred to himself as a "proud Christian Zionist" in reference to his support of Israel. Bannon reportedly spoke often with Trump donor Sheldon Adelson, and was alarmed at a push for a renewed Middle East peace process. He has described Palestinian president Mahmoud Abbas as a "terrorist". He has advocated giving the land in the West Bank to Jordan and in Gaza to Egypt.

United Kingdom 
Although "those who met him say" Bannon initially favored the British National Party (BNP) and the English Defence League (EDL) in the United Kingdom, he later backed the UK Independence Party (UKIP).

Bannon urged Boris Johnson, who Bannon said in July 2018 that he had known "over the last year" and was "very impressed" with, to challenge Prime Minister Theresa May. According to a BuzzFeed News report, Bannon was in private contact with Johnson during his visit to Britain that month, and the two men were previously in text communication during their respective tenures as White House Chief Strategist and British Foreign Secretary.

Europe 

Bannon has defended Trump's ties to and praise for Russian president Vladimir Putin. He expressed a belief that traditionalists see Russia as an ally. Bannon said they "believe that at least Putin is standing up for traditional institutions, and he's trying to do it in a form of nationalism—and I think that people, particularly in certain countries, want to see the sovereignty for their country. They want to see nationalism for their country" rather than a "pan-European Union". According to the book War for Eternity, Bannon met notorious Russian ideologue Aleksandr Dugin in Rome in 2018 to advocate closer relations between the United States and Russia, as well as Traditionalist philosophy.

In 2018, Bannon announced plans to launch a new political operation beginning with an attempt to unite populist parties across Europe before the 2019 European Parliament election. With the project to be based in Brussels, he indicated he would spend 50 percent of his time in Europe from the following November working at locations throughout the continent. Later that year, Bannon formed a foundation called The Movement to connect far-right groups throughout Europe.

Bannon is supportive of European right-wing populist national conservative movements such as the Hungarian Fidesz, the French National Front (now National Rally), the Spanish Vox, the Dutch Party for Freedom, Alternative for Germany, the Italian Northern League, the Freedom Party of Austria, the Sweden Democrats, the Danish People's Party, the Flemish Vlaams Belang and the New Flemish Alliance, the Polish Law and Justice, and the Swiss People's Party.

Islam
In 2007, Bannon proposed and developed a script for a documentary titled “Destroying the Great Satan: The Rise of Islamic Facism in America". The film's plot was that there was an effort by Muslims to take over America. 

In 2010, Bannon said "Islam is not a religion of peace. Islam is a religion of submission". He also criticized George W. Bush for calling Islam a religion of peace. Bannon has said that "Islam" today is "something much darker" than Adolf Hitler and the Nazis. He has also stated, "If you're Sharia-compliant ... we don't want you here," and has accused U.S. newspapers of being "Sharia-compliant." He has also stated, "The elites in Europe ... are allowing an Islamic invasion to take place."

In his talk delivered to a small conference in the Vatican during 2014, Bannon said: "If you look back at the long history of the Judeo-Christian West struggle against Islam, I believe that our forefathers kept their stance, and I think they did the right thing. I think they kept it out of the world, whether it was at Vienna, or Tours, or other places...it bequeathed to us the great institution that is the church of the West". He is reputed to believe Putin's Russia and Trump's America are Christian allies against the Islamic State and "radical Islamic terrorism". During Bannon's time in the Trump administration Bannon and Stephen Miller helped orchestrate Executive Order 13769 which banned entrance into United States from seven majority Muslim countries. Bannon has been linked to the counter-jihad movement.

Overview and influences
Bannon's ideology was the subject of the book War for Eternity by Benjamin R. Teitelbaum, where his thinking is described as combining elements of a radical version of the Traditionalist school with paleoconservatism and other more standard American conservative beliefs. Bannon's political and economic views have been described by others as nationalist, and right-wing populist. He self-identifies as a conservative. He rejects allegations that he is a white nationalist.

At a party congress in March 2018, Bannon gave members of the French right-wing populist National Front (NF) what has been described as a "populist pep talk". He advised party members to "Let them call you racist, let them call you xenophobes, let them call you nativists. Wear it like a badge of honor. Because every day, we get stronger and they get weaker...History is on our side and will bring us victory." Bannon's remarks brought the members to their feet. Critics expressed concern that Bannon was "normalizing racism."

Bannon was influenced by Fourth Turning theory, outlined in Neil Howe's and William Strauss's The Fourth Turning: An American Prophecy, one of Bannon's favorite books. The theory proposes that "populism, nationalism and state-run authoritarianism would soon be on the rise, not just in America but around the world. [...Once one strips] away the extraneous accidents and technology, you are left with only a limited number of social moods, which tend to recur in a fixed order" and cyclically. The book was major influence on Bannon's film Generation Zero.

Bannon's political beliefs have been influenced by René Guénon's traditionalism, a form of anti-modernist thought that views "certain ancient religions, including the Hindu Vedanta, Sufism, and medieval Catholicism" as being repositories of spiritual truth under attack by Western secularism; he synthesizes traditionalist beliefs with Catholic social doctrine, particularly the idea of subsidiarity, as expressed in the 1931 papal encyclical, Quadragesimo anno, defending that political matters ought to be handled by the lowest, least centralized competent authority. According to Bannon's former friends, he was particularly influenced by the Hindu scripture Bhagavad Gita and the ancient Chinese military treatise The Art of War. Bannon has also cited the Russian neo-fascist Alexander Dugin, who promotes a Russian nationalist variant of traditionalism called Eurasianism, and described himself as a fan of Dugin's book, The Fourth Political Theory. However, Bannon has urged Dugin to abandon his anti-American and Sinophile views. Bannon has also described Brazilian traditionalist thinker Olavo de Carvalho as "one of the great conservative intellectuals in the world".

Lebanese-American author Nassim Nicholas Taleb, neoreactionary blogger Curtis Yarvin and conservative intellectual Michael Anton have been pointed out as three of the main influences in Steve Bannon's political thinking. Bannon is an admirer of paleoconservative commentator Pat Buchanan. Bannon's favorite columnist is academic Walter Russell Mead. Political theorist and philosopher Edmund Burke has also been described as a major influence on Bannon's ideological outlook. In a 2014 speech to a Vatican conference, Bannon made a passing reference to Julius Evola, a twentieth-century, Nazi-linked Italian writer who influenced Benito Mussolini's Italian Fascism and promoted the Traditionalist School, described by a New York Times writer as "a worldview popular in far-right and alternative religious circles that believes progress and equality are poisonous illusions." Bannon's interest in the ideas of the Traditionalist School was driven by Evola's book Revolt Against the Modern World, and Guénon's books Man and His Becoming According to the Vedanta and The Crisis of the Modern World. In March 2016, Bannon stated he appreciates "any piece that mentions Evola." In referring to the associated views of Vladimir Putin, who is influenced by Evola follower Dugin, Bannon stated "We, the Judeo-Christian West, really have to look at what he's talking about as far as Traditionalism goes — particularly the sense of where it supports the underpinnings of nationalism." He has likewise quoted French anti-Enlightenment writer Charles Maurras approvingly to a French diplomat. Bannon has also repeatedly referenced the controversial French novel The Camp of the Saints (1973) by Jean Raspail, which depicts Third World immigration destroying Western civilization. He has embraced what BBC News describes as Savitri Devi's "account of history as a cyclical battle between good and evil". Bannon told an interviewer in 2018 that he is "fascinated by Mussolini", noting: "He was clearly loved by women. He was a guy's guy. He has all that virility. He also had amazing fashion sense, right, that whole thing with the uniforms." A former Breitbart writer wrote that Bannon said in 2015 that alt-right publication American Renaissance was "fighting the same fight" as him. Bannon has expressed admiration for German Conservative Revolutionary philosopher Martin Heidegger, praising his "ideas on the subject of being".

German film director Leni Riefenstahl, who produced propaganda films for the regime in Nazi Germany, is said to have influenced Bannon's film-making techniques, with Bannon once describing himself to writing colleague Julia Jones as the "Riefenstahl of George Bush", modifying the ending as "the GOP" when Jones was horrified. The opening of Bannon's documentary film The Hope & The Change (2012) consciously imitated Riefenstahl's film The Triumph of the Will (1935), which depicted the Nuremberg Rally held in 1934.

Personal life 

Bannon has been married and divorced three times. He has three adult daughters. His first marriage was to Cathleen Suzanne Houff. Bannon and Houff had a daughter, Maureen, in 1988 and subsequently divorced.

Bannon's second marriage was to Mary Louise Piccard, a former investment banker, in April 1995. Their twin daughters were born three days after the wedding. Piccard filed for dissolution of their marriage in 1997.

During their divorce proceedings, Piccard alleged that Bannon had made antisemitic remarks about her choice of schools, saying he did not want to send his children to The Archer School for Girls because there were too many Jews at the school, and Jews raise their children to be "whiny brats." Bannon's spokesperson denied the accusation, noting that he had chosen to send both his children to the Archer School.

Bannon's third marriage was to model Diane Clohesy; they married in 2006 and divorced in 2009.

His brother Chris Bannon is a TV producer.

Filmography 
Bannon has been a producer, writer, director or actor on the following films and documentaries:

See also 
 Mueller Report
 Russian interference in the 2016 Brexit referendum
 Timeline of Russian interference in the 2016 United States elections
 Russian interference in the 2016 United States elections

Notes

Breitbart called far-right

Breitbart associated with the alt-right

References

External links

 
 
 Federal fraud and money laundering indictment

|-

|-

Steve Bannon
1953 births
Living people
20th-century American naval officers
20th-century American newspaper publishers (people)
21st-century American male writers
21st-century American newspaper publishers (people)
Alt-right writers
American businesspeople in the online media industry
American chairpersons of corporations
American chief executives in the media industry
American chief executives of financial services companies
American critics of Islam
American Christian Zionists
American documentary film directors
American documentary film producers
American financial company founders
American investment bankers
American investors
American male non-fiction writers
American mass media company founders
American nationalists
American people of German descent
American people of Irish descent
American political activists
American political writers
Articles containing video clips
Breitbart News people
Businesspeople from California
Businesspeople from Virginia
Counselors to the President
Donald Trump 2016 presidential campaign
Walsh School of Foreign Service alumni
Far-right politics in the United States
Film directors from California
Film producers from California
Goldman Sachs people
Harvard Business School alumni
Military personnel from Norfolk, Virginia
Newsmax TV people
New York (state) Republicans
People associated with the 2016 United States presidential election
People charged with fraud
People convicted of contempt of Congress
People from Laguna Beach, California
Radio personalities from Virginia
Screenwriters from California
Screenwriters from Virginia
Trump administration personnel
Virginia Republicans
Virginia Tech alumni
Writers from Norfolk, Virginia
Recipients of American presidential pardons
Right-wing populism in the United States